The 2022 European Cadets Wrestling Championships (U17) is the 24th edition of European Cadets Wrestling Championship of combined events, and takes place from June 13 to 19 in Bucharest, Romania.

Competition schedule
All times are (UTC+3)

Medal table

Team ranking

Medal overview

Men's freestyle

Greco-Roman

Women's freestyle

Participating nations 
451 wrestlers from 33 countties:

  (1)
  (19)
  (8)
  (26)
  (29)
  (9)
  (8)
  (7)
  (10)
  (5)
  (13)
  (21)
  (24)
  (16)
  (26)
  (3)
  (15)
  (2)
  (6)
  (14)
  (20)
  (8)
  (2)
  (9)
  (25)
  (30)
  (1)
  (9)
  (6)
  (9)
  (9)
  (30)
  (30)

Russia and Belarus banned from attending all international competitions due to the 2022 Russian invasion of Ukraine.

References

External links 
 Database

Wrestling
European Wrestling Cadet Championships
European Wrestling Cadet Championships
European Wrestling Championships